Suza can refer to:

Suza, Osijek-Baranja County, a settlement in Croatian Baranja
Suza, Iran, a city on the Persian Gulf
Suza Rural District, in Iran
Sûza or Shire (Middle-earth), a region of J. R. R. Tolkien's fictional Middle-earth

See also
Susa (disambiguation)